Auraria may refer to:
Auraria, Georgia, a town in Lumpkin County, Georgia, United States
Auraria, Denver, a former territorial capital, now a neighborhood in Colorado
 Auraria Campus, an educational facility
 Auraria Library, an academic library
 Auraria (horse) (foaled 1892), winner of the 1895 Melbourne Cup
Auraria Stakes, a Group 3 Australian Thoroughbred horse race